David Armstrong (born 23 January 1987) is a Northern Irish professional footballer who plays for Mid-Ulster Football League side Ballymacash Rangers F.C. He previously played for IFA Premiership side Dungannon Swifts, as a defender. He began his career with Scottish Premier League side Heart of Midlothian and had loan spells at Crusaders, Cowdenbeath and Raith Rovers. Armstrong has represented Northern Ireland at under-17, 19 and 21 levels.

Career

Hearts
Armstrong began his career as a youth player with Lisburn Youth in Northern Ireland before joining Heart of Midlothian in Scotland in 2004 at youth level. He was initially released by Hearts in December 2004 to allow him to return to Northern Ireland due to personal reasons, where he played for Crusaders, but ultimately he spent the season on loan before returning to Hearts. Playing as a striker, he scored once for Crusaders, in a 2–3 defeat to Lisburn Distillery. Armstrong spent two further loans spells at Scottish Football League sides Cowdenbeath and Raith Rovers. In July 2012, Armstrong was released by the club having only made reserve appearances.

Linfield
On 7 August 2010, he signed for IFA Premiership side Linfield on a two-year contract.

Personal life
Armstrong was born in Lisburn and is the son of Winston Armstrong a former footballer with Lisburn Distillery. His middle name of Maradona is a tribute to Argentinian footballing legend Diego Maradona.

Honours
Linfield
IFA Premiership (2): 2010–11, 2011–12
Irish Cup (2): 2010–11, 2011–12
Irish League Cup 2017–2018

References

External links
Profile at Irish FA
Profile at londonhearts.com
NIFG profile

Living people
1987 births
Association footballers from Northern Ireland
Heart of Midlothian F.C. players
Crusaders F.C. players
Cowdenbeath F.C. players
Raith Rovers F.C. players
Linfield F.C. players
Scottish Football League players
NIFL Premiership players
Association football defenders
Ards F.C. players
Dungannon Swifts F.C. players
Sportspeople from Lisburn
Ballymacash Rangers F.C. players